The Call Girl is a best seller of 1958 written by the doctor Harold Greenwald, a psychotherapist whose doctoral dissertation is about the psychology of prostitutes. In 1960, he made a Hollywood movie on the same topic, Girl of the Night.

In 1970, a new edition of the book was published, titled The Elegant Prostitute.

References

External links
 
 

1958 non-fiction books
Non-fiction books about American prostitution
Psychology books
Non-fiction books adapted into films
Ballantine Books books